The National Road Transport Hall of Fame is an Australian transport museum in Alice Springs, Northern Territory, owned by the Road Transport Historical Society and opened in 1995. The Old Ghan Heritage Railway and Museum, which the society also operates, is on the adjoining site.

As a community-based volunteer organisation, the museum is dedicated to preserving Australia's road transport heritage. Many forms of road transport – from camel trains of old to road trains and coaches of today – are displayed.

The museum has taken what it calls a lateral approach to the restoration of vehicles: instead of showing them in off-the-production-line condition, they stand as they were in their working lives, including the pragmatic, often crude, modifications that bush mechanics had to undertake in Australia's harsh outback working environment; "testimony to the trials and tribulations of Australia's road transport industry pioneers".

In July 2019 the Government of the Northern Territory appointed an administrator while the society worked to achieve regulatory compliance.

See also 
Old Ghan Heritage Railway and Museum
List of transport museums

References

External links

The Road Transport Historical Society website

Museums in Alice Springs
Transport museums in the Northern Territory
Trucking subculture
Automobile museums in Australia
Halls of fame in Australia
Museums established in 1995
1995 establishments in Australia